Forever Words is a 2018 album by various artists recording poetry and lyrics by Johnny Cash set to music for the first time. The album follows a 2016 book release of the poems entitled Forever Words: The Unknown Poems. The album includes a posthumously released track by Chris Cornell, who died in 2017. In 2020 and 2021, a deluxe version of the album was released in four waves, with a total of 18 additional songs. The first and second waves were released on 
October 23 and December 11, 2020 with the two remaining waves set for release on February 5 and April 2, 2021 respectively.

Track listing
"Forever/I Still Miss Someone" – Kris Kristofferson and Willie Nelson 
"To June This Morning" – Ruston Kelly and Kacey Musgraves 
"Gold All Over the Ground" – Brad Paisley
"You Never Knew My Mind" – Chris Cornell 
"The Captain's Daughter" – Alison Krauss and Union Station 
"Jellico Coal Man" – T-Bone Burnett 
"The Walking Wounded" – Rosanne Cash 
"Them Double Blues" – John Mellencamp 
"Body on Body" – Jewel 
"I'll Still Love You" – Elvis Costello 
"June's Sundown" – Carlene Carter 
"He Bore It All" – Dailey & Vincent 
"Chinky Pin Hill" – I'm with Her 
"Goin', Goin', Gone" – Robert Glasper featuring Ro James and Anu Sun 
"What Would I Dreamer Do?" – The Jayhawks
"Spirit Rider" – Jamey Johnson

Deluxe Edition:
"Big Hearted Girl"  – Hard Working Americans 
"I'm Comin' Honey"  – Shawn Camp 
"Brand New Pair of Shoes"  – Ana Christina Cash 
"If You Loved Me"  – Elvis Costello and the Imposters 
"I've Been Around"  – Marty Stuart 
"Who's Gonna Grease My Skillet?"  – John Popper
"California Poem"  – Jamey Johnson, Sam Bush and Jerry Douglas 
"Little Patch of Grass"  – Brandon Robert Young and Clare Bowen 
"The Dogs Are In The Woods"  – John McEuen 
"Does Anybody Out There Love Me?"  – Jewel 
"Autumn"  – Watkins Family Hour 
"Let It Be Tonight"  – Ira Dean 
"Pretty Pictures in My Mind"  – The Lumineers 
"Outta Site Tonite"  – Ronnie Dunn and Brad Paisley 
"My Song"  – Runaway June 
"Dark and Bloody Ground"  – Ruston Kelly 
"The Third Degree"  – Aaron Lewis 
"Tecemesh"  – Bill Miller

Personnel
T. Bone Burnett
Chris Cornell
Elvis Costello
Jamey Johnson
Kris Kristofferson
Jewel
Willie Nelson
John Mellencamp
Brad Paisley
Kacey Musgraves
Rosanne Cash
Alison Krauss
Carlene Carter
I'm with Her (band)

Charts

See also
New Multitudes (2012), a similar project for Woody Guthrie lyrics
Lost on the River: The New Basement Tapes (2014), a similar project for Bob Dylan lyrics and featuring Burnett and Costello
Out Among the Stars (2014), a posthumous Cash album composed of abandoned sessions which also features Elvis Costello

References

External links

2018 albums
Johnny Cash
Collaborative albums
Legacy Recordings albums